Merchandise Mart is a building in Chicago, Illinois.

Merchandise Mart may also refer to:

Merchandise Mart station, a station on the Chicago Transit Authority's 'L' system
Merchandise Mart Annex, also known as 350 West Mart Center in Chicago
New York Merchandise Mart, a building in New York City
AmericasMart, also known as the Atlanta Merchandise Mart
K's Merchandise Mart, a catalog showroom department store based in Decatur, Illinois